The Bentall Centre is a large shopping centre in Kingston upon Thames, Greater London, England, which opened in 1992. It has been built in the retail space of Bentalls department store, opened in 1935. Bentalls, now part of the Fenwick group, retains a large premium department store in the renovated building. The centre is located adjacent to John Lewis Kingston, as well as the historic market town centre. There are 82 stores within the centre.

History and development
In 1987, construction began on creating a new Bentalls department store and shopping centre. This new development was to include a five level department store and a four level adjoining shopping centre including over 100 retail units. A pedestrian bridge across the Kingston Relief Road allowed access to and from the multi-storey car parks to the shopping centre.

The development took five years to complete and was built in two phases, allowing the existing department store to trade throughout the development period on a reduced footprint. The first phase, the 'new' department store opened in July 1990.

In 2012, it was reported that the centre is owned by the London-based Dutch privately held real estate investment company Meyer Bergman.

Current operations

Stores
Major stores in the centre include Bentalls department store, an Apple Store, Zara, H&M, Waterstones, EE, Starbucks, Vodafone and WHSmith.

Unique features
The shopping centre's atrium ceiling is higher than the nave of Westminster Abbey or the dome of St Paul's Cathedral. The original department store's 1935 façade designed by Maurice Webb was retained.

Another significant feature of the centre is an escalator which travels from the ground to the second floor. It is the largest single truss escalator in the world with only a top and bottom support.

When opened, a statue of Leonard Bentall by William Reid Dick was placed on the top floor looking down across the whole centre. However, when Fenwick bought the department store in 2001, they moved it to a secondary location as they believed it affected the sight lines into the store.

On opening, the Bentall Centre was the first shopping centre in the UK to adopt a "no smoking" policy throughout.

Gallery

References

External links
Bentall Centre
The Bentall Centre Scheme Overview

Shopping centres in the Royal Borough of Kingston upon Thames
History of the Royal Borough of Kingston upon Thames
Shopping malls established in 1992
1992 establishments in England